Aeolian Hall, at 135–137 New Bond Street, London, began life as the Grosvenor Gallery, being built by Coutts Lindsay in 1876, an accomplished amateur artist with a predeliction for the aesthetic movement, for which he was held up to some ridicule. In 1883, he decided to light his gallery with electricity. An outhouse became a substation, and equipment was installed in the basement, which upset some of the neighbours, and caused others to buy electricity from him. Thus began the system of electrical distribution in use today, but the threat of fire ended these activities, and by 1890, Lindsay was forced to sell out to the Grosvenor Club. By 1903 the whole building was taken over by the Orchestrelle Company of New York (the Aeolian Company). As manufacturers of musical instruments, and especially the mechanical piano-player known as the pianola, they converted the space into offices, a showroom, and a concert hall.

Aeolian Hall was a popular venue for the Russian recitalist Vladimir Rosing. The hall was even turned into an intimate opera house for one set of performances. In June 1921 Rosing presented, with director Theodore Komisarjevsky and conductor Adrian Boult, a season of Opera Intime, performing The Queen of Spades, The Barber of Seville, and Pagliacci. On 12 June 1923 the first performance of Facade, music by William Walton, poems by Edith Sitwell, took place.

After the destruction of their St George's Hall studios in March 1943, the BBC took it over for the recording and broadcast of concerts and recitals. The premises are currently converted to office use but remain otherwise intact.

References

External links

History of the London Aeolian Hall

Music venues in London
Buildings and structures in the City of Westminster